The Principality of Lüneburg, later also called Celle, was a territory within the Holy Roman Empire that existed from 1269 to 1705, whose land covered part of the modern-day German state of Lower Saxony.  The territory was granted imperial immediacy which gave it the special status of reporting directly to the emperor.  It emerged in 1269 following the division of the Duchy of Brunswick-Lüneburg, and its rulers continued to use the title of dukes of Brunswick-Lüneburg.  Lüneburg lost its independence in 1705 when it was inherited by the Principality of Calenberg (also known as Hanover), which however could keep a separate seat  in the Reichstag for Lüneburg or "Brunswick-Celle". The following is a list of all the rulers of Lüneburg during its time as an independent principality.

Rulers of the Principality of Lüneburg

Old House of Lüneburg

Old House of Brunswick

Dukes of Saxe-Wittenberg

Middle House of Brunswick

Middle House of Lüneburg

New House of Lüneburg

See also 
 List of consorts of Lüneburg
 List of the rulers of Brunswick-Wolfenbüttel

Sources 
 Geckler, Christa (1986). Die Celler Herzöge: Leben und Wirken 1371–1705. Celle: Georg Ströher. . .
 William Havemann: Geschichte the Lande Brunswick und Lüneburg, 3 Bde., Nachdruck. Hirschheydt, Hannover 1974/75,  (Originalausgabe: Verlag the Dietrich'schen Buchhandlung, Göttingen 1853–1857)
 Hans Patze (Begr.): Geschichte Niedersachsen, 7 Bde. Hahnsche Buchhandlung, Hannover 1977- (Veröffentlichungen the Historischen Kommission für Niedersachsen und Bremen, 36)

Lüneburg Heath
Luneburg
Lüneburg (district)
 
Lists of German nobility